Mesocreadium is a genus of trematodes in the family Opecoelidae. It consists of one species, Mesocreadium hoplichthidis Reimer, 1987.

References

Opecoelidae
Plagiorchiida genera
Monotypic platyhelminthes genera